Avima is a mountain (Mt. Avima) in the Republic of Congo near Gabon border to the west, and the Cameroon border to the north. It is a mountain with a 35 km west to east oriented ridge and has few top points which are in range of 950 m above the sea level. Mt. Avima has a significant deposit of iron ore and few small gold placer deposits. The mountain is covered by rain-forest.  The forest is inhabited by a small local tribe of native people who live on from hunting and from alluvial gold mining. Between March to September 2009 it was an access road built from Cameroon border to Mt. Avima for a mining exploration program arriving to the top of the mountain. After the exploration program, the road was covered by the rain forest blocking the access by vehicles to the mountain. Due to the significant quantities and qualities of iron ore discovered, it is expected that mining activities will start in the future.

Mining 
The first exploration program on Mt. Avima was carried out from 1964 to 1966 and followed up in 1980 by the French company BRGM and included an airborne magnetic survey followed by 29 diamond drill holes located mainly in the central part of the ridge on the total length of about 2000 m extracting several drilling cores. The access of staff with the drilling equipment to Mt. Avima was done by helicopters. 
In the years 2009 and 2010, the company Core Mining Limited completed and exploration program on Mt. Avima to reliable prove qualities and quantities of iron ore. The exploration program detected very significant quantities of iron ore. For being able to do this exploration program, Core Mining Limited constructed a 61 km access road from the Cameroonian border to Mt. Avima. The construction started from the existing road about 15 km from the village Lele, crossing the border near an abandoned town in the Cameroonian side by the name Alati. Following this exploration program, Avima became a known world class high grade iron ore deposit with over 700 million tonnes of JORC compliant which include itabirite (BIF) for direct shipping (DSO) resource.

Transport 
There are two proposed railway routes.

The shortest connects this mine with a crossborder standard gauge railway of the Sundance Resources railway at Mbalam in Cameroon.

An alternative export route is with a connection via Belinga in Gabon to a junction at Booue on the existing standard gauge railway in Gabon.

Timeline

2014 
 Contracts signed to build mine, railway and port for iron ore traffic.

See also 
 Iron ore in Africa
 Railway stations in Congo
 Railway stations in Cameroon
 Railway stations in Gabon

References

External links 
 CoreMining
 The Avima Project

Populated places in the Republic of the Congo